Beverly Ranch is a historic orange grove located at 923 West Fern Avenue in Redlands, California. Will and Elizabeth Eddy established the grove in 1888; after Will's death, Elizabeth married John Fisk, and the couple built the grove's main house in 1890. The couple was one of the many wealthy immigrant families from the East Coast who owned Southern California orange groves in the late 1800s. While citrus groves were ubiquitous at the time, Beverly Ranch is one of the few which is still in operation.

Architect Corydon B. Bishop designed the grove's Queen Anne house. The two-story redwood house has an asymmetrical plan with a multi-component roof. A wraparound front porch at the main entrance features a balustrade, turned posts, and decorative bracketing. The upper stories of the house feature shingle siding, several balconies, more brackets on the cornice, and cresting along the roof's gables.

The grove was added to the National Register of Historic Places on February 11, 2004.

References

Houses on the National Register of Historic Places in California
Queen Anne architecture in California
Houses completed in 1890
National Register of Historic Places in San Bernardino County, California
Houses in San Bernardino County, California
History of Redlands, California
Buildings and structures in Redlands, California